Tamar Ulysses Slay (born April 2, 1980) is an American basketball former college and professional player. A 6 ft 9 in (2.03 m) guard-forward, he was formerly with the National Basketball Association's New Jersey Nets and Charlotte Bobcats. He played college basketball at Marshall University.

High school and college

He graduated from Woodrow Wilson High School in Beckley, WV. He helped lead the school to state AAA basketball championships in 1997 and 1998, two of the five basketball state championships won by Woodrow Wilson High School in the 1990s. Afterwards, he attended Marshall University (Huntington, West Virginia). He was one of the team's most prominent players, averaging 15.7 points per game over his four-year college career.

Professional career

NBA
Slay was the 54th overall pick in the 2002 NBA draft, selected by the New Jersey Nets. He spent two seasons with the Nets. He then played for the Charlotte Bobcats during the 2004-2005 season.

Slay's final NBA game was played on December 10, 2004 in a 106 - 115 loss to the Phoenix Suns where he recorded 8 points, 2 assists and 2 rebounds.

International
In 2005 Slay joined Israeli leading team Hapoel Jerusalem, but after an unstable season he was released in late December 2006. On January 4, 2007, he signed with the Bakersfield Jam of the NBA Development League. For the 2007–08 season, he returned overseas with Pierrel Capo d'Orlando. In July 2008, he signed with Air Avellino. In July 2009, he signed with Carmatic Pistoia. In August 2010 he signed with his third team in Italy, Umana Venezia. He joined Sutor Basket Montegranaro in August 2012. In August 2013, he signed a one-year deal with Basket Brescia Leonessa.

Coaching career
In April 2022, Slay was hired by head coach Dan D'Antoni as an assistant coach at Marshall. He resigned from the position in May 2022, citing personal reasons.

NBA career statistics

Regular season

|-
| style="text-align:left;"| 
| style="text-align:left;"| New Jersey
| 36 || 0 || 7.6 || .379 || .280 || .700 || .9 || .4 || .4 || .1 || 2.6
|-
| style="text-align:left;"| 
| style="text-align:left;"| New Jersey
| 22 || 0 || 7.5 || .350 || .333 || .500 || 1.1 || .6 || .3 || .0 || 2.4
|-
| style="text-align:left;"| 
| style="text-align:left;"| Charlotte
| 8 || 0 || 9.8 || .333 || .167 || .000 || 1.8 || .4 || .6 || .0 || 3.5
|- class="sortbottom"
| style="text-align:center;" colspan="2" | Career
| 66 || 0 || 7.8 || .361 || .265 || .538 || 1.1 || .5 || .4 || .1 || 2.6

Playoffs

|-
| style="text-align:left;"| 2003
| style="text-align:left;"| New Jersey
| 6 || 0 || 1.8 || .250 || 1.000 || – || .0 || .0 || .0 || .0 || .5
|-
| style="text-align:left;"| 2004
| style="text-align:left;"| New Jersey
| 6 || 0 || 2.0 || .200 || .000 || 1.000 || .3 || .0 || .2 || .0 || .7
|- class="sortbottom"
| style="text-align:center;" colspan="2" | Career
| 12 || 0 || 1.9 || .222 || .500 || 1.000 || .2 || .0 || .1 || .0 || .6

Notes

External links
NBA stats
Italian League profile

1980 births
Living people
20th-century African-American people
21st-century African-American sportspeople
African-American basketball players
American expatriate basketball people in Israel
American expatriate basketball people in Italy
American men's basketball players
Bakersfield Jam players
Basketball players from West Virginia
Basket Brescia Leonessa players
Charlotte Bobcats expansion draft picks
Charlotte Bobcats players
Hapoel Jerusalem B.C. players
Israeli Basketball Premier League players
Lega Basket Serie A players
Marshall Thundering Herd men's basketball coaches
Marshall Thundering Herd men's basketball players
New Jersey Nets draft picks
New Jersey Nets players
Orlandina Basket players
Sportspeople from Beckley, West Virginia
Pistoia Basket 2000 players
Reyer Venezia players
Shooting guards
Small forwards
S.S. Felice Scandone players
Sutor Basket Montegranaro players
Woodrow Wilson High School (Beckley, West Virginia) alumni